Kondor (also Romanized as Kandor; also known as Kandū, Kondowr, Kuneh, and Qal‘eh-ye Kondor) is a village in Khorram Rud Rural District, in the Central District of Tuyserkan County, Hamadan Province, Iran. At the 2006 census, its population was 1,289, in 302 families.

References 

Populated places in Tuyserkan County